Bieberstedt Butte is a summit in the U.S. state of Oregon.

Bieberstedt Butte has the name of one Carl Bieberstedt.

References

Buttes of Oregon
Mountains of Jackson County, Oregon
Mountains of Oregon